Sea tulip is the common name of a few species of sessile ascidians (sea squirts) in the genus Pyura that live in coastal waters at depths of up to 80 m (260 feet). Like all ascidians, sea tulips are filter feeders. Their common name comes from their appearance - that of a knobbly 'bulb' or flower attached to a long stalk. Sea Tulips come in a variety of colours, including white, pink, yellow, orange, and purple. The colouration of sea tulips depends upon their association with a symbiotic sponge that covers their surface.

Despite their common name, sea tulips are animals and not plants.

Two examples of sea squirts known as sea tulips are P. pachydermatina and P. spinifera.

External links
 Wildlife of Sydney - Sea Tulip
 Sea Squirt, Sea Tulip Ascidian

Stolidobranchia
Invertebrate common names